John Laskin may refer to:
 John B. Laskin, justice in the Federal Court of Appeal of Canada
 John I. Laskin (born 1943), justice of the Court of Appeal for Ontario